Cootamundra, an electoral district of the Legislative Assembly in the Australian state of New South Wales, was created in 1904 and was abolished in 1941, returning one member until 1920, three members from 1920 to 1927 and one member from 1927 to 1941. It was recreated in 2015.


Election results

Elections in the 2010s

2019

2017 by-election

2015

1941 - 2015

Elections in the 1930s

1938

1935

1932

1930

Elections in the 1920s

1927

1925

1922

1920

Elections in the 1910s

1917

1913

1910

Elections in the 1900s

1907

1906 by-election

1904

Notes

References

New South Wales state electoral results by district